HMS Kruger was the flagship of the British Caspian Flotilla during the Russian Civil War.

Kruger was a small cargo ship with limited facilities to accommodate passengers. The initial armament consisted of four field guns placed on the forward cargo hatch, and attached to bales of cotton. The ship was commanded by a Russian captain.

References

Bibliography

Auxiliary cruisers of the Royal Navy
Russian Civil War
History of the Caspian Sea